Hapgood could refer to:

People
 Isabel Florence Hapgood (1851–1928), American writer and translator of Russian texts
 Norman Hapgood (1868–1937), American writer and journalist
 Hutchins Hapgood (1869–1944), American journalist and individualist anarchist
 Powers Hapgood (1899–1949), American Trade Union Organizer and Socialist Party leader
 Charles Hapgood (1904–1982), American college professor, known for his catastrophic pole shift theories
 Eddie Hapgood (1908–1973), English football player, who captained both Arsenal and England
 Tony Hapgood (1930–2011), English football player
 Leon Hapgood (born 1979), English football player

Buildings
 Hapgood House (built 1726), historic house in Stow, Massachusetts
 Richard Hapgood House (built 1889), historic house in Cambridge, Massachusetts

Other
 Hapgood, a 1988 play by Tom Stoppard